The Jean Marie River First Nation, known as Tthets'ék'ehdélı̨ in its own Dene language, is a First Nations band government in the Northwest Territories. The band is headquartered in the community of Jean Marie River.

The Jean Marie River First Nation is a member of the Dehcho First Nations.

References

First Nations in the Northwest Territories
Dene governments